Holy is the seventh studio album by German heavy metal band U.D.O. It was recorded and mixed by Stefan Kaufmann at Roxx Studio in Pulheim and is the band's first album with guitarist Igor Gianola, who had played with Ronni Le Tekrø in Wild Willy's Gang. The band recruited drummer Lorenzo Milani after the release of the album; in the liner notes "guess who" replaces the name of the drummer.

Track listings

Personnel
U.D.O.
Udo Dirkschneider – vocals, prodecer
Stefan Kaufmann – guitar, producer, engineering, mixing
Igor Gianola – guitar
Fitty Wienhold – bass guitar

Additional musicians
Frank Knight – backing vocals on "Holy", "Thunder in the Tower" and "State Run Operation", spoken words on "Holy"
Marcus Bielenberg – backing vocals on "Shout It Out"

Production
Manfred Melchior – mastering
Jens Rosendahl – photography
Andreas Marschall – cover art

References

1999 albums
U.D.O. albums
Nuclear Blast albums